Ajoy Sarkar (born 10 March 1997) is an Indian cricketer. He made his List A debut for Tripura in the 2016–17 Vijay Hazare Trophy on 25 February 2017.

References

External links
 

1997 births
Living people
Indian cricketers
Tripura cricketers
Place of birth missing (living people)